Smile: Songs from the Movies is a 2003 compilation of songs performed by Lyle Lovett for various movie soundtracks between 1992 and 2002.   Smile was the fifth project by Lovett that did not introduce a new collection of his own songs during the expanse of time between his 1996 Grammy winning The Road to Ensenada and My Baby Don't Tolerate (released later in 2003).  Other projects included a 1998 cover album, a 1999 live album, a 2000 movie soundtrack, and a 2001 anthology.  The release of Smile led some reviewers to speculate the Lovett might be experiencing some sort of writer's block.  Another possibility is that Lovett was taking it easy following a 2002 injury from an accident involving a bull on a family farm in Texas.  During the incident Lovett's leg was broken in 20 places.  A fracture to his thumb also left him unable to play guitar for an extended period.

The album has been described as a "nice listen" and "nice for collectors" to find all of these songs together, but "not essential,"  and "uneven."

Charts 
Smile peaked at 106 in the Billboard Hot 200, and reached 136 on Billboard's Top Internet Albums chart.

Track listing 
 "Blue Skies" (Berlin) – 3:11
 From With Honors, 1994
 "Straighten Up and Fly Right" (Cole, Mills) – 3:10
 From Dear God, 1996
 "Gee Baby, Ain't I Good to You" (Razaf, Redman) – 4:58
 From Kissing Jessica Stein, 2001
 "Smile" (Chaplin, Parsons, Turner) – 3:38 
 From Hope Floats, 1998
 "Moritat (Mack the Knife)" (Brecht, Weill) – 4:43
 From Quiz Show, 1994
 "Summer Wind" (Bradtke, Heinz Meier, Mercer) – 2:53
 From For Love of the Game (film), 1999
 "What'd I Say" (Charles) – 4:00
 From Where the Heart Is, 2000
 "Till It Shines" (Seger) – 3:50
 From Mumford, 1999
 Performed with Keb' Mo' 
 "You've Got a Friend in Me" (Newman) – 2:39
 From Toy Story, 1995
 Performed with Randy Newman
 "Walking Tall" (Bacharach, Rice) – 3:13
 From Stuart Little, 1999
 "Pass Me Not" (Crosby, Doane) – 5:00
 From Leap of Faith, 1992
 "I'm a Soldier in the Army of the Lord" (traditional) – 3:29
 From The Apostle, 1998

Chart performance

Notes and sources 

2003 compilation albums
Covers albums
Lyle Lovett albums